Salvatore Baccaro (6 May 1932 – 13 March 1984) was an Italian character actor. He was recognizable for his known acromegaly and appeared in more than sixty films from 1970 to 1984. He died on 13 March 1984 aged 52 after thyroid surgery.

Filmography

References

External links 

1944 births
1984 deaths
Italian male film actors
People with acromegaly